Pubic ligament can refer to:
 Inferior pubic ligament (ligamentum pubicum inferius)
 Superior pubic ligament (ligamentum pubicum superius)
 Pectineal ligament or Cooper's pubic ligament (ligamentum pectineum)